A cryptogene is a gene that has had its transcript edited.

Kinetoplastids have an unusual genetic system in their mitochondria.  The many strands of circular DNA are organized into a system of interlocking rings. There are two types of rings in the system known as maxicircles and minicircles. Researchers were surprised when they discovered that many of the transcribed cDNA genes from maxicircles did not yield functional proteins. Further research has shown that much of the cDNA in maxicircles requires extensive post-transcriptional modification of the resulting RNA, the majority of which is facilitated by Guide RNA coded in minicircles.

References

DNA
RNA
Genes
Kinetoplastids